Bärenklau station is a railway station in the Bärenklau district of the municipality of Oberkrämer, located in the Oberhavel district in Brandenburg, Germany.

References

Railway stations in Brandenburg
Buildings and structures in Oberhavel